The Melodi Grand Prix Junior 2008 was Norway's seventh national Melodi Grand Prix Junior for young singers aged 8 to 15. It was held on September 5, 2008 at the Oslo Spektrum, courtesy of NRK.

Over 500 submitted proposals for participation to NRK. The BlackSheeps won with their song "Oro jaska, beana" and went on to represent Norway in MGP Nordic 2008 which they also won.

Results

First round

Super Final
Here's the results from the superfinal. Highlighted contestants went to MGP Nordic 2008.

References

Melodi Grand Prix Junior
Music festivals in Norway